Kiyawa is a town and Local Government Area in Jigawa State, Nigeria.

Geography
It is situated on the road running between kano and Azare with Dutse (30 km west), Jemma (35 km east), and Azare (65 km east).

History
In 1801 the Hausa ruler Yakubu was killed attempting to storm the Zamfara fortress located here.

References

Local Government Areas in Jigawa State